Alvaradoia is a genus of moths of the family Noctuidae.

Species
 Alvaradoia deserti (Oberthür, 1918) (North-west Africa)
 Alvaradoia disjecta (Rothschild, 1920) (eastern Spain and southern France)
 Alvaradoia numerica (Boisduval, 1840) (Corsica and Sardinia)
 Alvaradoia ornatula (Christoph, 1887) (western Turkmenistan)

References
 Alvaradoia at Markku Savela's Lepidoptera and some other life forms
 Natural History Museum Lepidoptera genus database

Acontiinae
Noctuoidea genera